Giovanni Maria Tamburini (flourished 17th century) was an Italian painter of the Baroque period.

Biography
He was initially a pupil of Pietro Faccini, and then of Guido Reni in Bologna.  He painted for several of the churches in Bologna. He painted a St. Antony of Padua for the Hospital of Santa Maria della Morte, and an Annunciation for the Sanctuary of Santa Maria della Vita.

References

17th-century Italian painters
Italian male painters
Painters from Bologna
Italian Baroque painters
Italian engravers
Year of death missing
Year of birth missing